Guines may refer to:
 Güines, a city in Cuba
 Guînes, a commune in France

Similar spellings
 Gines (disambiguation)
 Güeñes, municipality in Biscay, Spain
 Guinness (disambiguation)